Terrence Agard (born 16 April 1990 in Willemstad) is a Dutch sprinter specialising in the 400 metres. He represented the Netherlands Antilles until the dissolution of that country in 2010.

In September 2015, he had a car crash while riding with fellow sprinters, Churandy Martina and Hensley Paulina, which left Agard with a broken vertebra in his neck. He returned to competition in April 2016.

International competitions

Personal bests

Outdoor
200 metres – 20.78 (-0.2 m/s, St-Martin 2015)
400 metres – 45.61 (La Chaux-de-Fonds 2019)
Indoor
400 metres – 46.77 (Apeldoorn 2015)

References

1990 births
Living people
Dutch male sprinters
Dutch Antillean male sprinters
People from Willemstad
Dutch people of Curaçao descent
Dutch Athletics Championships winners
Athletes (track and field) at the 2020 Summer Olympics
Medalists at the 2020 Summer Olympics
Olympic silver medalists in athletics (track and field)
Olympic silver medalists for the Netherlands
Olympic athletes of the Netherlands
21st-century Dutch people